Nhlakanipho Ntuli (born 10 February 1996) is a South African professional footballer who plays as a midfielder. He is former player of Free State Stars

Club career
Ntuli played youth football for Ajax, PSV and Orlando Pirates. He joined FC Twente in June 2013, and was loaned back to Orlando Pirates until he turned 18, re-joining the Dutch club in February 2014. He signed a five-year professional contract with Twente in April 2014. He made his senior debut for Jong FC Twente in the 2014–15 season.

International career
Ntuli received his first call-up to the South African national team in August 2014. At the youth level he played in the 2012 COSAFA U-17 Zone VI Tournament, 2013 African U-17 Championship qualifiers, the 2013 COSAFA U-20 Cup and 2015 African U-20 Championship qualifiers.

Personal life
Ntuli has spoken of his friendship with fellow player Kamohelo Mokotjo.

References

External links
 

1996 births
Living people
South African soccer players
South Africa youth international soccer players
Association football midfielders
AFC Ajax players
PSV Eindhoven players
Orlando Pirates F.C. players
FC Twente players
FC Košice (2018) players
South African Premier Division players
Eerste Divisie players
South African expatriate soccer players
South African expatriate sportspeople in the Netherlands
Expatriate footballers in the Netherlands
Expatriate footballers in Poland
Expatriate footballers in Slovakia
Sportspeople from Durban
South Africa under-20 international soccer players
Jong FC Twente players